Tomáš Vantruba (born 7 February 1998) is a Slovak footballer who plays for Slovan Duslo Šaľa as a forward.

Club career

Spartak Trnava
Vantruba made his Fortuna Liga debut for Spartak against Zemplín Michalovce on 11 August 2018.

Dynamo Malženice
On 22 February 2019, it was announced that Vantruba would spend the rest of the season on loan at Dynamo.

Personal life
He has a twin brother named Martin, who is a former under-21 international goalkeeper, currently signed to Nordsjælland of Danish Superliga.

References

External links
 FC Spartak Trnava official club profile
 
 Futbalnet profile
 Ligy.sk profile

1998 births
Living people
Slovak footballers
Association football forwards
FC Spartak Trnava players
OFK Malženice players
FK Slovan Duslo Šaľa players
Slovak Super Liga players
3. Liga (Slovakia) players
Sportspeople from Trnava